The Kalmakkyrgan, also known as Bileuty ( or Білеу), is a river in the Ulytau District, Karaganda Region, Kazakhstan.

The river flows across a desert and semi-desert area without permanent settlements. In the early summer there are temporary camps of shepherds near the Kalmakkyrgan consisting of one or more yurts. The water of the river is brackish, but suitable for livestock drinking purposes.

Etymology
The name of the river originated in the Kazakh language word for "the place where the Kalmyks were killed", referring to an event of the Kazakh–Dzungar Wars that took place in 1730 by the river banks. Formerly the river was known as Bileuty, a name that is still used to refer to a stretch of its upper course.

Course
The river has its sources near the southern slopes of Karamola mountain, southeastern Ulutau Range. In its first stretch it heads roughly southwards as the Bileuty. Further down its course the river describes a wide bend and flows roughly southwestwards and then westwards to the south of the Baikonyr through a wide valley. In its final stretch it bends again to flow northwestwards and nearly northwards. The river has its mouth in the southern end of the Shubarteniz lake, but its waters mostly get lost in the sands before reaching it.

The river is fed by the winter snows and is frozen between November and March. Following the thaw it flows until May, when it breaks up into ponds. In the summer it dries up. Its main tributaries are the Keregetassay, Amanzholsay, Duysembay, Sholaksay, Zhide and Bozingen from the right, as well as the Karsakpai, Talsay, Karatobesay, Ashylysay and Akkiiksay from the left.

See also
List of rivers of Kazakhstan

References

External links
Сердце Казахстана — Улытау (in Russian)
Пресс-релиз — Аральское море (in Russian)
Туристско-научная экспедиция - Казахстанская правда (in Russian)
История Улытау (in Russian)

Rivers of Kazakhstan
Karaganda Region
Shalkarteniz basin